The 2000 Uncensored was the sixth and final Uncensored professional wrestling pay-per-view (PPV) event produced by World Championship Wrestling (WCW). The event took place on March 19, 2000 from the American Airlines Arena in Miami, Florida. As of 2014 the event is available on the WWE Network.

Storylines
The event featured professional wrestling matches that involve different wrestlers from pre-existing scripted feuds and storylines. Professional wrestlers portray villains, heroes, or less distinguishable characters in the scripted events that build tension and culminate in a wrestling match or series of matches.

Event

The show opened with Chris Candido making his debut, joining the announce team, stating he will defeat whoever wins the opening match, for the championship. The opening match saw The Artist Formerly Known as Prince Iaukea retain the WCW Cruiserweight Championship against Psychosis. Iaukea hit a jumping DDT for the pin, after Paisley distracted Psychosis.

Miss Hancock next joined the announce, after Lane and Rave said they no longer wanted her to be their manager. Miss Hancock announced that she already had her new tag team, Silver King and El Dandy. In the next match Norman Smiley and The Demon defeated Lane and Rave via submission to Smiley's Crossface Chickenwing.

Bam Bam Bigelow next defeated The Wall by disqualification, after The Wall chokeslammed Bigelow through a table.

In a hardcore match, under elimination rules, for the WCW Hardcore Championship Brian Knobbs defeated 3 Count (Evan Karagias, Shannon Moore, and Shane Helms). Knobbs first pinned Helms after holding a steel chair to his face and hitting it with a mop. Knobbs then pinned Karagias following a powerbomb from the ring onto the floor, through a table. Moore thought he then pinned Knobbs after Karagias hit a dropkick off the top, putting Knobbs through a table, however Knobbs was able to get his foot onto the bottom rope. Knobbs then hit Moore with a trashcan off the middle rope, for the pin.

In the next match Billy Kidman and Booker T beat Harlem Heat 2000 (Big T and Stevie Ray) via pinfall. In a Falls Count Anywhere match, Vampiro next defeated Fit Finlay. In the next match The Harris Brothers (Ron Harris and Don Harris) won the WCW World Tag Team Championship by defeating The Mamalukes (Big Vito and Johnny the Bull), in a no disqualification match.

Prior to the next match Terry Funk brought out a chicken, stating it was Dustin Rhodes' little brother. The match was scheduled to be a bullrope match, however during the match Funk stated he was changing the match to an "I Quit" match. Although Funk was about to get Rhodes to quit the referee stated that Funk did not have the authority to change the match stipulation.

The following match was a Lumberjack match between Sting and The Total Package. The lumberjacks for the match were: Jimmy Hart, Curt Hennig, Doug Dillinger, Fit Finlay, Brian Knobbs, Vampiro, Ron Harris, Don Harris, Stevie Ray, Big T and Hugh Morrus. Sting's lumberjacks had casts on their hands that were broken by Luger in the past. Package's lumberjacks had fake casts on their arm to mock and have the same advantage as Sting's lumberjacks. During the match, Tank Abbott came down to ringside and punched Doug Dillinger in the face. During the match, Ric Flair and Elizabeth interfered trying to attack Sting, but were both taken down by Jimmy Hart and Vampiro. Ultimately Sting was able to defeat Luger via pinfall following the Scorpion Death Drop.

During the WCW World Heavyweight Championship match, Sid Vicious retained his title against Jeff Jarrett. After Jarrett hit Sid with the Guitar, Hulk Hogan interrupted the referee's count and attacked Jarrett. Scott Steiner, after having not appeared on TV for 2 months, made a surprise return attacking Hogan. Ric Flair immediately came out and started his scheduled Yappapi Indian Strap match with Hogan. Hogan was ultimately able to pin Flair despite outside interference from Lex Luger.

Reception
In 2007, Arnold Furious of 411Mania gave the event a rating of 1.5 [Extremely Horrendous], stating, "I’m nearing the end of my WCW coverage and it’s about damn time. The shows are genuinely getting worse with Booker/Kidman v Harlem Heat scoring MOTN here at *1/2. That’s just sad. If you see WCW on a tape and then 2000 after the initials then the show sucks. Avoid at all costs."

Results

References

Professional wrestling in Miami
Events in Miami
2000 in Florida
WCW Uncensored
March 2000 events in the United States
2000 World Championship Wrestling pay-per-view events